The 39th Avenue station (signed as the 39th Avenue–Dutch Kills station and formerly known as the 39th Avenue–Beebe Avenue station) is a local station on the BMT Astoria Line of the New York City Subway. It is located at 39th Avenue and 31st Street in Long Island City, Queens.  The station is served by the N train at all times, as well as by the W train on weekdays.

History 
This station opened on February 1, 1917, along with the rest of the Astoria Line, which was originally part of the IRT, as a spur off the IRT Queensboro Line, which is now the IRT Flushing Line. Trains ran between Grand Central and Astoria. On July 23, 1917, the Queensboro Bridge spur of the elevated IRT Second Avenue Line opened. At that time, all elevated trains to Queensboro Plaza used the Astoria Line while all subway trains used the IRT Flushing Line, though this was later changed with trains alternating between branches. This station started to be served by BMT shuttles using elevated cars on April 8, 1923.

The city government took over the BMT's operations on June 1, 1940, and the IRT's operations on June 12, 1940. On October 17, 1949, the Astoria Line became BMT-only as the tracks at Queensboro Plaza were consolidated and the platforms on the Astoria Line were shaved back to allow BMT trains to operate on it. Service was initially provided by the Brighton Local (BMT 1) and the Broadway–Fourth Avenue Local (BMT 2) at all times.

Station renovations 
The project cost $863,000. Signals on the line had to be modified to take the platform extensions into account.

Under the 2015–2019 MTA Capital Plan, the station underwent a complete overhaul as part of the Enhanced Station Initiative and was entirely closed for several months. Updates included cellular service, Wi-Fi, USB charging stations, interactive service advisories and maps. The award for Package 2 of the renovations, which covered renovations at the 30th Avenue, Broadway, 36th Avenue, and 39th Avenue stations, was awarded on April 14, 2017, to Skanska USA. The Broadway and 39th Avenue stations were closed entirely on July 2, 2018, and reopened on January 24, 2019, slightly earlier than expected. A previously demolished entrance to the northeast corner of Broadway and 31st Street was added once again to improve access. New station signage saying "39th Avenue–Dutch Kills" was installed after the Dutch Kills Civic Association requested it. Trains and subway maps still use the old "39th Avenue" name.

Station layout

This elevated station has three tracks and two side platforms. The center track is not used in revenue service, but it had been used regularly as recently as 2002. The center track merges with the two outer tracks south of this station.

Both platforms have beige windscreens that run along their lengths and red canopies with green support columns in the center. The station signs are in the standard black name plate in white lettering.

Exits
This station has one elevated station house beneath the center of the platforms and tracks. Two staircases from each platform go down to a crossunder that has a news-stand and small turnstile bank. Outside fare control, there is a token booth and two staircases going down to the northwest and southeast corners of 39th Avenue and 31st Street. The lower base of the platform staircases have emergency gates leading directly to the top of the street stairs.

References

External links 
 
 
 Station Reporter — N Train
 TheSubwayNut - 39th Avenue 
 39th Avenue entrance from Google Maps Street View
 Platforms from Google Maps Street View

1917 establishments in New York City
BMT Astoria Line stations
Long Island City
New York City Subway stations in Queens, New York
Railway stations in the United States opened in 1917